The 2023 CSUN Matadors men's volleyball team represents California State University, Northridge in the 2023 NCAA Division I & II men's volleyball season. The Matadors, led by first year head coach Theo Edwards, play their home games at Premier America Credit Union Arena (formerly the Matadome). The Matadors compete as members of the Big West Conference and were picked the finish sixth in the Big West preseason poll.

Preseason

Coaches poll 
The preseason poll was released on December 21, 2022. CSUN was picked to finish fifth in the Big West Conference standings.

Roster

Schedule
TV/Internet Streaming/Radio information:
ESPN+ will carry most home and all conference road games. All other road broadcasts will be carried by the schools respective streaming partner. 

 *-Indicates conference match.
 Times listed are Pacific Time Zone.

Announcers for televised games

Cal Lutheran: Darren Preston
The Master's: Darren Preston
Menlo: Darren Preston
USC: 
UCLA: 
Vanguard: 
Stanford: 
Princeton: 
NJIT: 
Fairleigh Dickinson: 
Benedictine: 
Westcliff: 
UC San Diego: 
Stanford: 
UC San Diego: 
Daemen: 
Hawai'i: 
Hawai'i: 
UC Irvine: 
UC Irvine: 
Long Beach State: 
Long Beach State: 
UC Santa Barbara: 
UC Santa Barbara: 
Big West Tournament:

Rankings 

^The Media did not release a Pre-season poll.

References

2023 in sports in California
2023 NCAA Division I & II men's volleyball season
CSUN